Amphidromus costifer is a species of large-sized air-breathing tree snail, an arboreal gastropod mollusk in the family Camaenidae.

Subspecies
 Amphidromus costifer costifer E. A. Smith, 1893
 Amphidromus costifer gemmalimae Thach, 2020

Description 
A large and thick Amphidromus species with strong growth lines. The holotype is 46.5 mm in height, and 29.0 mm in width.

Distribution 
The type locality is Annam in Central Vietnam.

References 

 Schileyko, A. A. (2011). Check-list of land pulmonate molluscs of Vietnam (Gastropoda: Stylommatophora). Ruthenica. 21 (1): 1-68.

External links
 Smith, E. A. (1893). Descriptions of six new species of land-shells from Annam. Proceedings of the Malacological Society of London. 1: 10-13

costifer
Gastropods described in 1893